The 1965 Gator Bowl may refer to:

 1965 Gator Bowl (January), January 2, 1965, game between the Florida State Seminoles and the Oklahoma Sooners
 1965 Gator Bowl (December), December 31, 1965, game between the Georgia Tech Yellow Jackets and the Texas Tech Red Raiders